Fatman the Human Flying Saucer is a fictional character, a comic book superhero created by artist C. C. Beck and writer Otto Binder in the 1960s.

Beck and Binder created Fatman long after Beck's popular creation Captain Marvel was canceled partly due to a copyright infringement suit with DC Comics.

Overview

Fatman's costume was green and yellow with a yellow flying saucer emblem on the chest. Fatman was fat and could change into a human flying saucer. His comic ran for only three issues and was published by Lightning Comics, an almost equally short lived company. Fatman comics were produced in small numbers and are considered valuable because of Beck's artwork and their rarity.

Van Crawford became Fatman after coming to the aid of an alien flying saucer. The saucer itself turned out to be a shapeshifting alien, which rewarded Crawford by giving him a chocolate drink with the ability to transform him into a human flying saucer.  Being a wealthy man, like many superheroes of the era, Crawford decided to use this newfound power to become a superhero. He teamed up with a teenage sidekick, Tin Man, who could turn into a robot.

In popular culture
Fatman was also mentioned on the second episode of series 2 of the British panel show Question Time in 2022.

References

External links
International Hero entry

1967 comics debuts
American comics titles
Characters created by Otto Binder
Comics characters introduced in 1967